Kathryn Pogson (born 1954) is an English film and stage actress. She appeared in Terry Gilliam's 1985 cult film Brazil.  She won a Best Actress Drama Desk Award for her performance in the 1986 New York production of Aunt Dan and Lemon.

She grew up in Halifax, West Riding of Yorkshire, where she attended Crossley & Porter Grammar School. She has appeared on television many times including appearances in We'll Meet Again, Midsomer Murders and Foyle's War.

Work

Theatre work
 2019 My Brother's Keeper | Mrs Stone | The Playground Theatre | Craig Gilbert
 2015 Antigone | Eurydice | Barbican | Ivo van Hove
 2012 The Bachae | Agave | Royal & Derngate, Northampton | Laurie Sansom
 2012 Blood Wedding | The Mother | Royal & Derngate, Northampton | Laurie Sansom
 2011 Sixty-Six Books: The Foundation | Theta | Bush Theatre | Peter Gill
 2009 Legacy | Dorothy Whitney Elmhirst | Theatre of Angels (National Tour) | Maria Pattinson
 2005 Carver | Woman | Arcola | William Gaskill
 2003 Girl Watching | Polly | Birmingham Rep/Tour | Natasha Betteridge
 2002 Just Between Ourselves | Vera | No 1 Tour | Dominic Hill
 2001 Cherished Disappointments in Love | Her | Sphinx – Helsinki State Theatre | Sue Parish
 1998 The Snow Palace | Stanislava | Sphynx – Tricycle and Oslo | Janet Suzman
 1997 The Honest | Viola | The Globe Theatre | Jack Shepherd
 1997 The Merchant of Venice | Portia | The Globe Theatre | Richard Olivier
 1997 The Brutality of Fact | Maggie | New End Theatre
 1997 The Cenci | Lucretia | Almeida Theatre
 1995 The Fairy Queen | Helena | Lisbon
 1992 The Crackwalker | Sandy | Gate Theatre 
 1991 The Lady from the Sea | Ellida | Women's Playhouse Trust
 1990 Nightingale | Florence | Dimson Theatre NY
 1989 Richard III | Lady Anne | Phoenix Theatre, London
 1989 Richard II | Queen Isabel | Phoenix Theatre, London
 1988 One Way Pendulum | Sylvia | Old Vic
 1987 A Midsummer Night's Dream | Helena | Royal Shakespeare Company
 1987 The Balcony | Carmen | Royal Shakespeare Company | Terry Hands
 1985 Aunt Dan and Lemon | Lemon | Royal Court Theatre | The Public Theater | won Drama Desk Award for Outstanding Actress in a Play
 1985 Deadlines | Jane Carberry | Royal Court Theatre
 1984 The Lucky Chance | Leticia | Royal Court Theatre
 1983 Masterpieces | Rowena | Royal Court Theatre
 The Shelter | The Woman | Lyric Theatre, London
 Hamlet | Ophelia | Donmar Warehouse
 At Home | Two Hander | Riverside Studios
 Touched | Betty | Royal Court Theatre
 Hedda Gabler | Thea Elvsted | Roundhouse
 The Arbor | Girl | Royal Court Theatre
 Twelfth Night | Viola | The Dukes, Lancaster
 Macbeth | Lady Macbeth | Theatremobile
 Jack and the Beanstalk | Fairy Dewdrop | Bacup Empire | Gloria Parkinson

Filmography

Television

References

External links

 Entry on aveleyman website

Living people
English film actresses
1954 births
English stage actresses
Actors from Halifax, West Yorkshire
Actresses from Yorkshire
20th-century English actresses
21st-century English actresses